Lucas Elías Morales Villalba (born 14 February 1994) is a Uruguayan footballer who plays as a defender for Montevideo Wanderers in the Uruguayan Primera División.

References

External links
Profile at Copa Libertadores

1994 births
Living people
Defensor Sporting players
Montevideo Wanderers F.C. players
Uruguayan Primera División players
Uruguayan footballers
Association football defenders